General elections were held in Bosnia and Herzegovina on 1 October 2006. They decided the makeup of Bosnia and Herzegovina's Presidency as well as national, entity, and cantonal governments.

The elections for the House of Representatives were divided into two; one for the Federation of Bosnia and Herzegovina and one for Republika Srpska. In the presidential election, voters in the Federation elected Bosniak Haris Silajdžić and Croat Željko Komšić, while voters in Republika Srpska elected Serb Nebojša Radmanović. The Party of Democratic Action emerged as the largest party in the House of Representatives, winning 9 of the 42 seats.

Background
Analysts claimed that the 2006 election would be the most important since Bosnia and Herzegovina's independence from Yugoslavia, and the subsequent Bosnian War. With the previous government failing to agree reforms to the constitution, and Bosnian Muslim politicians continuing to threaten the abolition of Republika Srpska and officials in Republika Srpska continuing to speak of possible secession from the country in response, the election was seen as crucial in determining the future of Bosnia and Herzegovina. The results were tentatively welcomed by commentators, and described as bringing "small signs of change to a Bosnia where institutional fragmentation has cemented ethnic division", with the result suggesting "a certain retreat of nationalism among the Muslim and Croat communities".

Controversy
A controversy emerged over the election of the Croatian member of Presidency. Although Željko Komšić, an ethnic Croat and member of the Social Democratic Party, he was alleged by his political opponents to have received votes mainly from Bosniaks. He was accused by his opponents that he was not the choice of Croats, but rather Bosniaks, citing that he did not win majority for Croat representative in any of the cantons with Croat majority. This is the result of the fact that in the Federation of Bosnia and Herzegovina, both Bosniak and Croat Presidency members are on one ballot, letting the voter choose to vote in either category regardless of their own ethnicity.

Results

Presidency
One Presidency member was elected from each of the country's three constitutional peoples: Bosniaks, Croats and Serbs.

House of Representatives
According to the constitution of Bosnia and Herzegovina, the representatives from the Federation of Bosnia and Herzegovina are allocated 28 seats, while the representatives from Republika Srpska have 14 seats. There are 42 seats in total.

By entity

House of Peoples
The 15 members of the House of Peoples were elected in the entities' Parliaments - 10 members by the House of Representatives of the Federal Parliament (5 Bosniaks and 5 Croats); and 5 members by the National Assembly of Republika Srpska.

Entity Parliaments
On the entity level, the Federation of Bosnia and Herzegovina and Republika Srpska elected new governments.

Federation of Bosnia and Herzegovina
In the Federation this includes:
Federal Prime Minister
Federal House of Representatives
Federal House of Peoples

House of Representatives of the Federation of Bosnia and Herzegovina

Republika Srpska

In the Republika Srpska, the government is made up of:
President (Serb) and vice-presidents (Croat and Bosniak) of Republika Srpska
Prime Minister of Republika Srpska
National Assembly of Republika Srpska

Canton Parliaments
All 289 mandates in the assemblies of the Cantons of the Federation of Bosnia and Herzegovina were up for election; the same parties elected into the Federal Parliament were elected onto cantonal assemblies (skupština kantona/скупштина кантона in Bosnian and Serbian, sabor županije in Croatian).

Source - Central Electoral Commission of Bosnia and Herzegovina

References

External links
Bosnian Electoral Commission official site
Bosnia’s “Historic” Elections: The Usual Tensions, Plus a Seed of Hope, Washington Report on Middle East Affairs, December 2006

Bosnia
General election
Elections in Bosnia and Herzegovina
October 2006 events in Europe
Election and referendum articles with incomplete results